Nation Party may refer to:

Active parties

Nation Party (Turkey, 1992)
Egyptian Nation Party, or Egyptian Umma Party
Nation Party of Iran
Japan Nation Party
Nation Party, or National Umma Party Sudan
Welsh Nation Party

Former parties

Romania
Party of the Nation, or National Renaissance Front of Romania
Thailand
Thai Nation Party
Turkey
Nation Party (Turkey, 1948), active from 1948 to 1953
Nation Party (Turkey, 1962), active from 1962 to 1977

See also
 National Party (disambiguation)